The Wibault company or Société des Avions Michel Wibault was a French aircraft manufacturing company. Its workshops were located in Billancourt, in the Paris area.<ref>Jean Liron, La SFCA – Avions Maillet-Taupin-Lignel, Aviation Magazine International no. 817-828, 1982</ref>

History
The Wibault company was established in 1919 by Michel Wibault. The planes produced by Wibault in the first decade included reconnaissance, fighter and bomber  aircraft, but production shifted mainly to civilian aircraft after 1930.

Some of the Wibault designs were quite successful; the Vickers Wibault was a licensed version of the Wibault 7 built by the British company Vickers in the 1920s.

In 1930 Société des Avions Michel Wibault built the Wibault-Penhoët 280, which was funded by the Penhoët (Chantiers St. Nazairre) shipyard and the following year the companies merged to form Chantiers Aéronautiques Wibault-Penhoët.  That company produced the Wibault-Penhoët 280 series of trimotor airliners, twelve of which were bought by Air France.  They also built transport and racing types but in 1934 were taken over by Breguet Aviation who built several Wibault designs including the Breguet 670 twin-engined airliner.

 Aircraft 
 Wibault 1 fighter 1918
 Wibault 2 night bomber 1921
 Wibault 3 fighter 1923
 Wibault 7 fighter 1924
 Wibault 72 fighter 1928
 Wibault 73 fighter 1927
 Wibault 74 fighter 1930
 Wibault 8 Simoun fighter
 Wibault 9 fighter 1926
 Wibault 10 twin boom project
 Wibault 10/II re-allocated for two-seat parasol wing reconnaissance aircraft, built for A.2 1923 competition
 Wibault 12 Sirocco  fighter
 Wibault 121 Sirocco reconnaissance
 Wibault 122 fighter
 Wibault 123 reconnaissance
 Wibault 124 surveillance 1929
 Wibault 125 reconnaissance 1930
 Wibault 13 Trombe I single seat lightweight fighter to C.1 1926 Jockey fighter contest
 Wibault 130 Trombe I fighter
 Wibault 170 Tornade'' fighter 1928
 Wibault 210 fighter 1929
 Wibault 220 reconnaissance 1930
 Wibault 240 transport seaplane 1933
 Wibault 260 long range reconnaissance 1930
 Wibault 280T civil airliner 1930
 Wibault 281T
 Wibault 282T
 Wibault 283T
 Wibault 313
 Wibault 360T5 civil airliner 1931
 Wibault 361
 Wibault 362
 Wibault 363
 Wibault 364
 Wibault 365
 Wibault 366
 Wibault 367
 Wibault 368
 Breguet-Wibault 670 civil airliner 1935

Significant projects 
Wibault 4 heavy bomber project (no data)
Wibault 5 single-seat parasol-wing fighter project, submitted to C.1 1923
Wibault 6 two-seat parasol-wing fighter derivative of Wibault 5
Wibault 11 single-seat fighter project powered by one 500 hp engine, for C.1 1923
Wibault 14 two-seat parasol wing tourist aircraft project
Wibault 14H a floatplane version of Wibault 14
Wibault 15 single-seat fighter project to C.1 1926 contest
Wibault 160 Trombe II a more powerful version of Wibault 130 Trombe I, also for C.1 1926
Wibault 230 three-engined transport aircraft project (no data)
Wibault 270 single-seat lightweight fighter project for C.1 1928
Wibault 330 transport aircraft (no more details)
Wibault 340 two-seat low-wing tourist aircraft project

References

External links

1933 Fin des Wibault & Nid 622
AIR FRANCE : La Saga
Breguet-Wibault 670
Breguet-Wibault 670T 1935
Douchy Gustave, Wibault test pilot

 
Arrondissement of Boulogne-Billancourt